Solo Beverage Company, also known as Joseph Charles Bottling Works and Investments Ltd., is a soft drink manufacturer in Trinidad and Tobago.

History 
The company was founded by Joseph Charles (born Serjad Makmadeen) in 1949 and is currently owned by the Charles family. It is located on the Churchill Roosevelt Highway in San Juan.

Products 
 Solo Apple J: apple spritzer
 Solo Pear J: pear spritzer
 Royal Crown cola (under licence)
 Diet Royal Crown cola (under licence)
 Upper 10: lemon & lime lemonade (under licence)
 Solo Bentley: carbonated lime lemonade
 Diet Solo Bentley
 Solo Apple, Guava, Mango, Banana, Orange, Pineapple, Grape, and Sorrel: sugared juices
 Solo Kola Champagne, Ginger Ale, Ginger Beer, and Cream Soda: soft drinks
 Aqua Pure Water

References

External links
 Solo Beverage Official Site

Drink companies of Trinidad and Tobago
Soft drinks manufacturers
Brands of Trinidad and Tobago